The 2022 UTSA Roadrunners baseball team represented the University of Texas at San Antonio in the sport of baseball for the 2022 college baseball season. The Roadrunners competed in Division I of the National Collegiate Athletic Association (NCAA) and in Conference USA. They played their home games at Roadrunner Field in San Antonio, Texas. The team was coached by Patrick Hallmark, who was in his third season with the Roadrunners.

Preseason

C-USA media poll
The Conference USA preseason poll was released on February 16, 2022 with the Roadrunners predicted to finish in sixth place in the conference.

Preseason All-CUSA team
Jonathan Tapia – Utility

Personnel

Schedule and results

Schedule Source:
*Rankings are based on the team's current ranking in the D1Baseball poll.

Postseason

References

External links
•	UTSA Baseball

UTSA
UTSA Roadrunners baseball seasons
UTSA Roadrunners baseball